The Louisville and Nashville Railroad Office Building, at 908 W. Broadway in downtown Louisville, Kentucky, is a historic skyscraper building, built in 1907, which is listed on the National Register of Historic Places.  It was once the headquarters of the Louisville and Nashville Railroad, a prominent railroad company from the mid-19th century to the 1970s.

Architecture 
The structure is eleven stories tall. The first three stories are made of stonework of rusticated ashlar, with capital-topped pilasters in a series. Floors four to ten have ashlar pilasters framing a finish of red brick. Windows of the building are done in series of three.  The attic is 1.5 stories tall, and features the distinctive initials of the Louisville and Nashville Railroad.

It was designed by W. H. Courtenay, the chief architect of the Louisville and Nashville Railroad, in a Beaux Arts style; one of the largest commercial buildings in that architectural style still standing.

In 1930 an eight-bay western addition which duplicated the look of the original 10-bay building was added, built by then-current chief architect of the Louisville and Nashville Railroad J. C. Haley.

History 

The original Louisville and Nashville Railroad offices in Louisville were at Second and Main in Louisville, by the entrance of present-day George Rogers Clark Memorial Bridge. By 1890, it had become obvious that the building was too overcrowded. It was decided that the office building should be located next to Louisville's Union Station. Construction began in 1902, but its completion was delayed until January 1907, due to difficulties with organized labor in a 1905 steel workers strike. Its total cost was $650,000. It was large enough that after decades of separation, all of the main administrative staff could be in the same building.

In the 1970s, about 2,000 L&N employees worked in the building. After L&N was purchased by CSX nearly all of the jobs were moved from Louisville to Jacksonville, Florida, in 1980. However, a 6-person CSX claims department stayed in the building until 1988.

Along with many other buildings, it was listed on the National Register of Historic Places in 1983 as result of a study of historic resources in West Louisville.

In 1984, the state of Kentucky spent $15 million to purchase and renovate the property, retaining the L&N name and neon lights on its upper stories.

The building is currently the Louisville offices for the Kentucky Cabinet for Health and Family Services.

In August 2009, the building was closed due to the 2009 Kentuckiana Flood, but would reopen as soon as deemed safe.

References 

Office buildings completed in 1907
Office Building
National Register of Historic Places in Louisville, Kentucky
Commercial buildings on the National Register of Historic Places in Kentucky
Skyscraper office buildings in Louisville, Kentucky
1907 establishments in Kentucky
Office buildings on the National Register of Historic Places
Corporate headquarters in the United States
Transportation buildings and structures in Louisville, Kentucky